Nikola Stoyanov Anastasov (22 April 1932 – 8 August 2016) was a Bulgarian actor.

Biography 
Nikola Anastasov was born on 22 April 1932 in Sofia, Bulgaria. He finished his education at the Krastyo Sarafov National Academy for Theatre and Film Arts, in the class of Prof. Philip Philipov. He is married to Bulgarian singer Marya Koseva; they have two sons.

He died on 8 August 2016 in Sofia, aged 84.

Career 
Nikola Anastasov began performing in the theaters in Vratsa (1955–1956) and Varna (1956–1957). His first important role was in the comedy Когато розите танцува (When The Rose Dances) by Valeri Petrov. His later well known roles include Trimata ot zapasa (1971), Osmiyat (1969) and Samo ti, sartze (1987).

Filmography 
Badi shtastliva, Ani! (1961)
The last round (Последният рунд) (1961) as Garo
Hot Afternoon (Горещо пладне) (1965)
On the Sidewalk (По тротоара) (1967)
With the medals of the devil (С пагоните на дявола) (1967, TV Series) as Zhano
Posledniat voyvoda (1968) as Fotografat
Byalata staya (1968) as Dirigent na orkestara
Gospodin Nikoy (1969) as G-n Hayg
Osmiyat (1969) as Chaplin
Priznanie (1969)
Trimata ot zapasa (1971) as Pejo Vutov
Gerlovska istoriya (1971) as Tzvika
The Phoney Civilization (Криворазбраната циливизация ) (1974, TV Movie) as Dimitraki
Nako, Dako i Tsako: Moryatsi (1974) as Tsako
Panteley (1978) as Marko
Unexpected vacation (Неочаквана ваканция) (1981, TV Series) as Trader Lambo
Samo ti, sartze (1987) as D-r Dzhaldeti
Rapsodiya v byalo (2002) as Staretz v starcheskiya dom
The Infinite Garden (2017) as Garabedian

References 

1932 births
2016 deaths
Bulgarian male film actors
Bulgarian male stage actors
Bulgarian male television actors
20th-century Bulgarian male actors
Male actors from Sofia